The Civic Democratic Union was a liberal political party in Slovakia between 1991 and 1994. It was founded as the Civic Democratic Union–Public Against Violence as a new political party succeeding former political movement Public Against Violence (VPN). During his term as the Prime Minister of Czechoslovakia, Marián Čalfa joined the party and became one of the leading members. In 1992 Slovak parliamentary election party failed to gain any seats in parliament. In 1994, the party merged into the Democratic Party.

References

Liberal parties in Slovakia
Liberal conservative parties in Slovakia
Political parties established in 1991
Political parties disestablished in 1994
Political parties in Czechoslovakia
Defunct political parties in Slovakia